The Arunachal Baptist Church Council (ABCC) is a Baptist Christian denomination in the state of Arunachal Pradesh in North East India. ABCC is led by Mr. Pema Tshetan, President, and Advocate Tugaso Manyu, General Secretary. The convention has its office at Naharlagun, Papum Pare District. ABCC is a member convention of the Council of Baptist Churches in Northeast India.

ABCC had 132,787 baptized members in 1,141 churches and 30 Fellowships  under 20 Baptist member associations / Councils in 2022.

Statistics 
The number of churches and baptized members of Constituent member associations/ councils of ABCC as on 2020:

Communicant members including children and non-baptized family members are not included in the statistics.

See also
 Council of Baptist Churches in Northeast India
 North East India Christian Council
 Christianity in Arunachal Pradesh
 List of Christian denominations in North East India

References

External links
 abccindia.org Official website
 CBCNEI

Baptist denominations in India
 
Religion in Arunachal Pradesh